William Wilson House may refer to:

 William Wilson House (Elizabethtown, Kentucky), listed on the National Register of Historic Places (NRHP) in Kentucky
 William J. Wilson House, Gastonia, North Carolina, NRHP-listed
 Willie W. Wilson House, Fort Towson, Oklahoma, listed on the NRHP in Oklahoma
 William T. E. Wilson Homestead, Sisters, Oregon, NRHP-listed
 William W. and Christene Wilson House, Sandy, Utah, listed on the NRHP in Utah
 William Wilson House (Gerrardstown, West Virginia), listed on the NRHP in West Virginia

See also
Wilson House (disambiguation)